Date Night is a 2010 American comedy film.

Date Night may also refer to:

Television
 Date Night (TV series), a 2018 Australian reality television series

Episodes 
 "Date Night" (According to Jim)
 "Date Night" (At Home with Julia)
 "Date Night" (Back to You)
 "Date Night" (Brothers & Sisters)
 "Date Night" (Entourage)
 "Date Night" (Gigolos)
 "Date Night" (Kendra)
 "Date Night" (Kitchen Boss)
 "Date Night" (Parenthood)
 "Date Night" (Quintuplets)
 "Date Night" (Top Chef: Masters)
 "Date Night" (Woke Up Dead)

Other media 
 "Date Night" (The New Avengers), a story arc in the Marvel Comics series The New Avengers
 "Date Night" (Ultimate X-Men), a 2006 story arc in the Marvel Comics series Ultimate X-Men
 Date Night, a 1980s radio program hosted by Susan Block
 "Date Night", a song by Father John Misty from God's Favorite Customer